"Good From Afar" is the first single released from Melbourne band Horsell Common's first album The Rescue. The single entered the Australian Independent Records Chart at #5 and at number 95 on the ARIA Charts.

Track listing
"Good from Afar" – 3:18
"Good from Afar (Remix)" – 6:10
"Weeds" – 3:07
"A Praise Chorus" – 4:21
"Blood and Wine" – 3:59

Charts

References

2007 singles
2007 songs